The standard licence plates in Croatia consist of a two-letter city code which is separated by the Coat of Arms of Croatia from three or four numbers and one or two letters.

Regular plates
The standard regular plate consists of three or four randomly assigned numbers, one or two randomly assigned letters, and the first two letters indicate the city, separated by the Croatian Coat of Arms, while the numbers and the last letters are separated by a dash (example; ZG 000-A, ZG 000-AA, ZG 0000-A or ZG 0000-AA). The letters Q, W, X and Y are not used in Croatian plates because they are not in Croatian alphabet. Since Croatia entered the European Union in 2013, there have been proposals to permanently change the design scheme (consisting of new letter font and ideas to replace the Coat of Arms with four red squares). However, in July 2016, it was determined to keep the original design and add the blue EU-issued sticker, applying the standard with EU member states and Vienna convention. The design of Croatian licence plates comes from old Yugoslavian licence plates from the 1980s, and it remained the same (with a notable difference of switching the red star, Yugoslavian national symbol, with the Coat of Arms).

Customized plates

There is also a possibility of having a customized plate for a fee. One type of customized plate looks exactly like the standard ones, with the exception that the combination of numbers and letters is personally chosen by the vehicle's owner. The other kind of customized plates can consist of a word with from four to seven letters or a combination of the word with four or five letters and one or two numbers. However, these plates are still quite rare in Croatia, mostly because they can only be used for five years after the first registration and they also require a fee of 2,000 kuna (cca. 270 euros).

Special plates

There are also some special plates. While the numbers and letters on standard licence plates are colored black, plates for foreign citizens permanently living in Croatia, international organizations and temporary registered vehicles have green numbers and letters. On the plates used on bigger trucks and other vehicles that can be oversized for some of the smaller roads, the numbers and letters are red. 

The police vehicles are equipped with the plates consisting of six numbers divided in two groups and separated by the Coat of Arms of Croatia, blue numbers. The first group of numbers denote the police department to which the vehicle belongs. While the background on all of these plates is colored white, on those used on military vehicles it is yellow. However, the system of dividing numbers and letters is the same as on the standard plates, but instead of a city code there are letters HV for Hrvatska vojska (Croatian military). At the same time, specialized military vehicles have the letters VP for vojna policija or MP for military police (military police) as the final two letters.
Plates for diplomatic representatives (embassies, consulates) are blue with yellow numbers and letters. The first three number denote the country, followed by letter A, C, or M, then serial number of the vehicle.

As opposed to all above mentioned plates that are made of metal, the dealer's test plates are stickers that are attached to the plate holder. These plates consist of a city code separated by the coat of arms from five numbers divided in two groups and they can be used for a limited number of days.

Starting from 2008 onwards, special plates with an additional two letters (PP or PV) were introduced, PP stands for prijenosne pločice (transferable plates) and PV stands for povijesno vozilo (historical vehicle) in a form CC-PV-NNN(N).

Also from 2008 onwards, export plates are introduced, with RH standing for Republika Hrvatska, and a green background with yellow numbers and letters. Croatia's Ministry of Internal Affairs proposed new licence plates with the EU stars.

City codes

Obsolete codes

Partial index of diplomatic, consular and foreign mission prefixes

Sources

References

External links

Road transport in Croatia
Croatia
 Registration plates
Croatia transport-related lists